The Second Sea Lord and Deputy Chief of Naval Staff (formerly Second Sea Lord) is deputy to the First Sea Lord and the second highest-ranking officer to currently serve in the Royal Navy and is responsible for personnel and naval shore establishments. Originally titled Second Naval Lord in 1830, the post was restyled Second Sea Lord in 1904. They are based at Navy Command, Headquarters.

History
In 1805, for the first time, specific functions were assigned to each of the 'Naval' Lords, who were described as 'Professional' Lords, leaving to the 'Civil' Lords the routine business of signing documents. The Second Naval Lord was the second most senior Naval Lord on the Board of Admiralty and as Chief of Naval Personnel was responsible for handling all personnel matters for the Royal Navy. In 1917 the title was changed to the Second Sea Lord and Chief of Naval Personnel by an order in council dated 23 October.

The posts of Second Sea Lord and Commander-in-Chief, Naval Home Command (CINCNAVHOME) were amalgamated in 1994 in the reductions of the British Armed Forces following the end of the Cold War. The original post of Commander-in-Chief, Naval Home Command had been created on 1 July 1969, as a result of the merger of the posts of Commander-in-Chief, Portsmouth and Commander-in-Chief, Plymouth.

2SL is based in Portsmouth in a combined headquarters with the Fleet Commander on Whale Island. The right to use HMS Victory as a flagship came from his position as CINCNAVHOME, who in turn acquired it from the Commander-in-Chief, Portsmouth. Since October 2012, distinct Commander-in-Chief posts have been discontinued and full command responsibility is vested in the First Sea Lord, who now flies his flag from Victory; this change formed part of the Levene reforms which were implemented at that time.

In 2016 the post was retitled Second Sea Lord & Deputy Chief of Naval Staff and defined as "responsible for the delivery of the Naval Service’s current and future personnel, equipment and infrastructure".

Second Naval Lords, 1830–1904
Second Naval Lords include:
 Rear Admiral George Dundas, 1830–1834
 Vice-Admiral Sir William Parker, 1834
 Vice-Admiral Sir John Beresford, 1835–1841
 Vice-Admiral Sir William Parker, 1835–1841
 Rear Admiral Sir Edward Troubridge, 1841
 Vice-Admiral Sir William Gage, 1841–1846
 Vice-Admiral Sir James Dundas, 1846–1847
 Vice-Admiral Sir Henry Prescott, 1847
 Vice-Admiral Sir Maurice Berkeley, 1847–1852
 Vice-Admiral Sir Houston Stewart, 1852
 Vice-Admiral Sir Phipps Hornby, 1852–1853
 Vice-Admiral Sir Maurice Berkeley, 1853–1854
 Vice-Admiral Sir Richard Dundas, 1854–1855
 Vice-Admiral Henry Eden, 1855–1857
 Vice-Admiral Sir Richard Dundas, 1857
 Vice-Admiral Henry Eden, 1857–1858
 Vice-Admiral Sir Richard Dundas, 1858–1859
 Rear Admiral Frederick Pelham, 1859–1861
 Vice Admiral Sir Charles Eden, 1861–1866
 Vice-Admiral Sir Sydney Dacres, 1866–1868
 Vacant, 1868–1872
 Vice Admiral Sir John Tarleton, 1872–1874
 Vice-Admiral Sir Geoffrey Hornby, 1874–1877
 Vice-Admiral Sir Arthur Hood 1877–1879
 Admiral The Earl of Clanwilliam, 1879–1880
 Admiral Lord John Hay, 1880–1883
 Admiral Lord Alcester, 1883–1885
 Admiral Sir Anthony Hoskins, 1885–1888
 Vice-Admiral Sir Vesey Hamilton, 1888–1889
 Admiral Sir Henry Fairfax, 1889–1892
 Admiral Sir Frederick Richards, 1892–1893
 Admiral Lord Walter Kerr, 1893–1895
 Vice-Admiral Sir Frederick Bedford, 1895–1899
 Admiral Lord Walter Kerr, 1899
 Vice-Admiral Archibald Douglas, 1899–1902
 Admiral Sir John Fisher, 1902–1903

Second Sea Lords, 1904–1917
Second Sea Lords include:
 Vice-Admiral Sir Charles Drury, 1903–1907
 Admiral Sir William May, 1907–1909
 Vice-Admiral Sir Francis Bridgeman, 1909–1911
 Vice-Admiral Sir George Egerton, 1911
 Vice-Admiral Prince Louis of Battenberg, 1911–1912
 Vice-Admiral Sir John Jellicoe, 1912–1914
 Vice-Admiral Sir Frederick Hamilton, 1914–1916
 Vice-Admiral Sir Somerset Gough-Calthorpe, 1916
 Admiral Sir Cecil Burney, 1916–1917

Second Sea Lord and Chief of Naval Personnel 1917 to 1995
 Admiral Sir Rosslyn Wemyss, 1917
 Vice-Admiral Sir Herbert Heath, 1917–1919
 Admiral Sir Montague Browning, 1919–1920
 Admiral Sir Henry Oliver, 1920–1924
 Vice-Admiral Sir Michael Culme-Seymour, 1924–1925
 Vice-Admiral Sir Hubert Brand, 1925–1927
 Admiral Sir Michael Hodges, 1927–1930
 Admiral Sir Cyril Fuller, 1930–1932	
 Admiral Sir Dudley Pound, 1932–1935
 Admiral Sir Martin Dunbar-Nasmith, 1935–1938
 Admiral Sir Charles Little, 1938–1941
 Admiral Sir William Whitworth, 1941–1944
 Admiral Sir Algernon Willis, 1944–1946
 Admiral Sir Arthur Power, 1946–1948
 Admiral Sir Cecil Harcourt, 1948–1950
 Admiral Sir Alexander Madden, 1950–1953
 Admiral Sir Guy Russell, 1953–1955
 Admiral Sir Charles Lambe, 1955–1957
 Vice-Admiral Sir Deric Holland-Martin, 1957–1959
 Admiral Sir St John Tyrwhitt, 1959–1961
 Admiral Sir Royston Wright, 1961–1965
 Admiral Sir Desmond Dreyer, 1965–1967
 Admiral Sir Peter Hill-Norton, 1967
 Admiral Sir Frank Twiss, 1967–1970
 Vice-Admiral Sir Andrew Lewis, 1970–1971
 Admiral Sir Derek Empson, 1971–1974
 Admiral Sir David Williams, 1974–1977
 Admiral Sir Gordon Tait, 1977–1979
 Admiral Sir Desmond Cassidi, 1979–1982
 Admiral Sir Simon Cassels, 1982–1986
 Admiral Sir Richard Fitch, 1986–1988
 Admiral Sir Brian Brown, 1988–1991
 Admiral Sir Michael Livesay, 1991–1992
 Admiral Sir Michael Layard, 1992–1995

Second Sea Lords and Commanders-in-Chief Naval Home Command, 1995–2012

Second Sea Lords and Commanders-in-Chief include:

Second Sea Lords and Chiefs of Naval Personnel and Training, 2012–2015

Second Sea Lord and Deputy Chief of the Naval Staff, 2015–present
See: Deputy Chief of the Naval Staff

Departments under the office
As of September 2020:

Current
 Director People and Training, previously the Naval Secretary
 Director Development, previously the Assistant Chief of the Naval Staff (Capability)
 Office of the Assistant Chief (Policy)
 Office of the Director of Personnel and Training & Office of the Naval Secretary
 Director Navy Acquisition

Former
Included:
 Admiralty Interview Board
 Naval Careers Service
 Naval Education Service
 Office of the Medical Director-General (Naval)
 Royal Navy Medical Service
 Royal Naval Hospital
 Office the Director Naval Nursing Service
 Queen Alexandra's Royal Naval Nursing Service
 Royal Naval Reserve
Royal Marines Reserve
 Department of the Director Combined Operations Personnel
 Department of the Director Naval Education
 Britannia Royal Naval College
 Royal Naval College, Dartmouth
 Royal Naval College, Greenwich
 Royal Naval College (Portsmouth)
 Royal Naval War College
 Department of the Engineer Rear Admiral Assistant
 Department of the Paymaster Director General
 Department of the Director General Medical Services
 Department of the Director General Supply & Secretariat Branch 
 Department of the Director of Air Personnel
 Department of the Paymaster Director-General
 Department of the Director Physical Training & Sport
 Department of the Director of Personnel Services
 Department of the Director Welfare Conditions
 Department of the Director of Manning
 Department of the Director Recruiting
 Department of the Director Service Conditions
 Department of the Director of Training 
 Directorate General Training, (1960–1969)
 Directorate-General Naval Manpower and Training (1972–1994)
 Department of the Engineer-in-chief, as regards personnel 
 Medical Director-General of the Navy
 Dental Examining Board
 Medical Consultative Board
 Medical Examining Board
 Naval Intelligence Department, as regards mobilisation of the fleet 
 Naval Mobilisation Department, as regards personnel
 Office of the Admiral Commanding, Coastguard and Reserves
 Office of the Admiral Commanding Reserves, as regards personnel 
 Office of the Admiral Superintendent, Naval Reserves, as regards personnel 
 Office of the Adviser on Education
 Office of the Chief of Staff, Reserves
 Office of the Controller of the Coastguard
 Office of the Deputy Adjutant General Royal Marines
 Office of the Adjutant General Royal Marines
 Office of the Chaplain of the Fleet, as regards naval schools 
 Office of the Engineer Rear Admiral for Personnel Duties
 Royal Naval Academy
 Royal Naval Volunteer Reserve
 Statistics Department

See also 

 First Sea Lord
 Third Sea Lord
 Fourth Sea Lord
 Fifth Sea Lord

References

 

 

Royal Navy

Royal Navy appointments
Admiralty during World War II